The following is a list of awards in the fields of bioinformatics and computational biology.

Awards

 ASBMB DeLano Award for Computational Biosciences - "to a scientist for the most accessible and innovative development or application of computer technology to enhance research in the life sciences at the molecular level"
 Benjamin Franklin Award for Open Access in the Life Sciences - "to an individual who has, in his or her practice, promoted free and open access to the materials and methods used in the life sciences"
 ISCB Innovator Award - "leading scientists who are within two decades post-degree, who consistently make outstanding contributions to the field, and who continue to forge new directions"
 ISCB Overton Prize - "for outstanding accomplishment to a scientist in the early to mid stage of his or her career"
 ISCB Accomplishment by a Senior Scientist Award - "members of the computational biology community who are more than 12 to 15 years post-degree and have made major contributions to the field of computational biology through research, education, service, or a combination of the three"
 Research Parasite Award - "Outstanding contributions to the rigorous secondary analysis of data"
 The SIB Bioinformatics Awards - since 2008, the Swiss Institute of Bioinformatics has delivered awards to acknowledge early career bioinformaticians and ground-breaking resources of national or international standing.

See also

 List of biology awards
 List of computer-related awards

References

Bioinformatics
Biology awards
Bioinformatics